Novell exteNd, formerly known as SilverStream, was a web application development suite from Novell that was discontinued in 2005. The latest version was 5.2. With the release of Novell Identity Manager 3, the components of the portal services in exteNd were rebranded into the IDM User Application, a component of NetIQ Identity Manager.

The ExteNd platform provides a visual environment that simplifies the development and deployment of business solutions that exploit existing systems. Based on Java technology, it contains tools for integration of legacy systems to Web Services with XML and Java EE. Web Portal contains standard-based portlets.

Integration connectors includes:
 IBM 3270
 IBM 5250
 EDI
 HTML
 SAP
 CICS
 JMS
 HP 3000
 JDBC
 LDAP
 Telnet
 Tandem
 T27

External links
 Novell's product page for exteNd
 CSO August 2004
 Expanding Choice Book
 InfoWorld

Java enterprise platform
Extend